Shiek Abdulazis Guroalim Saromantang is a Maranao, an Ulama, and a specialist in Arabic sayings in the Qur’an. He was the first Filipino Muslim who translated Qur’an into Maranao language. He was a former mayor of Tugaya, Lanao del Sur.

Qur'an translation in Maranao Language 
Ustadz Muhammad Sulaiman, a Maguindanaon, criticized Saromantang's second chapter translation on the Qur'an telling the story about "Moses." Two Maranao people Jamil Tamano and Saromantang's grandson Rasol Abbas defended the criticism as Lanao del Sur and Maguindanao have different native language.

See also 

 Maranao darangen (Native language in Lanao provinces used in some translations of Saromantang)
Maguindanaon language (Native language in Maguindanao province)
Qur'an Translation (Brief history)
Penterjemahan Al-Quran (Wikipedia page: Malay and Indonesian on the Qur'an Translation)

References 

Filipino religious leaders
Filipino Muslims
People from Lanao del Sur
Mayors of places in Lanao del Sur
Politicians from Lanao del Sur
Year of birth missing (living people)
Living people
21st-century Filipino politicians